David L. Shapiro (born June 13, 1943) is an American psychologist and independent practitioner  in forensic psychology. He is a fellow of the American Psychological Association (Divisions 41, 42 and 46) and is licensed to practice psychology in four states (Maryland, New York, Florida, New Jersey) and the District of Columbia. He is the author of many articles and books on issues in the field of forensic psychology, including Psychological Evaluation and Expert Testimony  and   Forensic Psychological Assessment: An Integrative Approach.

Works
His contributions to the field of forensic psychology include information on how to determine whether or not an offender will exert violent behavior in the future.

Footnotes

External links
Due Process in Licensing Board Hearings

21st-century American psychologists
Forensic psychologists
1943 births
Living people
Fellows of the American Psychological Association
20th-century American psychologists